Higginbotham is an English surname. Notable people with the surname include:

Abraham Higginbotham, American screenwriter
Andy Higginbotham, English footballer
Antony Higginbotham (born 1989), British politician
Charles Higginbotham, Cricketer 
Danny Higginbotham, Gibraltar footballer
Don Higginbotham, Historian 
Ernest Higginbotham, Footballer
Evelyn Brooks Higginbotham, professor of African-American studies, African-American Religion and the Victor S. Thomas Professor of History at Harvard University
Fred Higginbotham, Ice Hockey player
G. J. Higginbotham, American politician from Alabama
Grady Higginbotham, college coach of baseball, basketball, and football at Texas Tech
Harry Higginbotham, Australian footballer 
Henry Higginbotham, Artist
Irene Higginbotham, songwriter and concert pianist
J. C. Higginbotham, jazz trombonist
James Higginbotham, Professor 
Joan Higginbotham, astronaut
Kallum Higginbotham, Footballer
Irv Higginbotham, Baseball player
A. Leon Higginbotham, Jr., United States Appellate Court judge
Patrick Higginbotham, United States Appellate Court judge
Peter Higginbotham, English historian of workhouses and children's homes
Scott Higginbotham, Australian Rugby Union player
Susan Higginbotham, Author
Tegan Higginbotham, Australian actress and comedian
Stephen Brian Higginbotham llAmerican Handyman. A jack of all trades and talents. Artist, inventor, footballer, expert knife thrower and many many more

See also
Higginbotham Insurance & Financial Services, an independent insurance brokerage firm founded in 1948.
Higginbotham's, a company of book sellers and publishers in India.

English-language surnames

Stephen Brian Higginbotham ll: American Handyman. A jack of all trades and talents. Artist, inventor, footballer, expert knife thrower and many many more but above all a guy to have on your side and as a friend.